The New Democratic Party is a social democratic political party in Canada.

New Democratic Party may also refer to:

Current parties

National
 New Democratic Party (Saint Vincent and the Grenadines), a right-wing party in St. Vincent and the Grenadines
 Social Democratic Party (Serbia), known as the New Democratic Party from June to October 2014
 New Democratic Party of Serbia, formerly known as the Democratic Party of Serbia

Subnational
 A provincial or territorial section of the Canadian New Democratic Party:
 Alberta New Democratic Party
 British Columbia New Democratic Party
 New Brunswick New Democratic Party
 Newfoundland and Labrador New Democratic Party
 Nova Scotia New Democratic Party
 Ontario New Democratic Party
 Metro New Democratic Party, an informal party of New Democratic Party members in metro Toronto municipal politics in the late 20th century
 New Democratic Party of Manitoba
 New Democratic Party of Prince Edward Island
 New Democratic Party of Quebec
 Saskatchewan New Democratic Party
 Yukon New Democratic Party

Defunct parties 
 New Democratic Party (Albania), 1999 to 2009
 New Democratic Party (New Zealand), 1972
 New Democratic Party (South Korea), 1963 to 1980
 United New Democratic Party (South Korea), 2007 to 2008

See also 
 Democratic Party (disambiguation)
 New Democracy Party (disambiguation)
 New Democracy (disambiguation)
 New Democratic Front (disambiguation)
 New Democrats, a faction in the United States Democratic Party